Flagey may refer to:

Places
Flagey Square, a square in Ixelles, Brussels, Belgium
Flagey Building, or Le Flagey, a cultural institution on Flagey Square, Brussels
Flagey, Doubs, a commune in the department of Doubs, France
Flagey, Haute-Marne, a commune in the department of Haute-Marne, France
Flagey-Echézeaux, a commune in the department of Côte-d'Or, France
Flagey-lès-Auxonne, a commune in the department of Côte-d'Or, France
Flagey-Rigney, a commune in the department of Doubs, France

People
Camille Flagey (1837-1898), lichenologist
Eugène Flagey, a Belgian lawyer and politician after whom Flagey Square is named